Cerro Solo is a large stratovolcano on the border between Argentina and Chile, west of Ojos del Salado with an elevation of  metres. It consists of nine eruptive centers and is covered in light-colored rhyodacite pyroclastic flow deposits.

Its territory is within the Argentinean protection area of Catamarca High Andean and Puna Lakes Ramsar Site. It is located in the territory of the Argentinean province of Catamarca (commune of Fiambalá) and the Chilean province of Copiapo (commune of Copiapó).

First Ascent 
Solo was first climbed by Luis Alvarado, Jorge Balastino, Carlos and Oscar Alvarez (Chile) on 21 February 1950.

See also
List of volcanoes in Argentina
List of volcanoes in Chile

Notes

External links 

 Elevation information about Solo
 Weather Forecast at Solo

References 

 

Volcanoes of Atacama Region
Mountains of Chile
Stratovolcanoes of Chile
Mountains of Argentina
Stratovolcanoes of Argentina
Volcanoes of Catamarca Province
Polygenetic volcanoes
Six-thousanders of the Andes